The former government of Alexei Kosygin was dissolved following the Soviet legislative election of 1974. Kosygin was once again elected premier by the Politburo and the Central Committee following the election. His fourth government lasted for nearly five years, until the 1979 Soviet election.

Ministries

Committees

References 
General

Government of the Soviet Union > List
 

Specific

Soviet governments
1974 establishments in the Soviet Union
1979 disestablishments
Era of Stagnation